The  (known in English as the "Half Moon Camp") was a prisoner-of-war camp in Wünsdorf (now part of Zossen), Germany, during the First World War.

The camp housed between 4,000 and 5,000 Muslim prisoners of war who had fought for the Allied side. The intended purpose of the camp was to convince detainees to wage jihad against the United Kingdom and France. To that end, "detainees lived in relative luxury and were given everything they needed to practise their faith". It was the site of the first mosque to be built in Germany, a large and ornate wooden structure finished in July 1915. The mosque, modelled on the Dome of the Rock, was demolished in 1925–26 owing to disrepair. 

About 80 Sikh prisoners and Hindus from British India were also held in the camp, as well as around 50 Irishmen, and two Australian Aboriginal soldiers (Roland Carter and Douglas Grant).

The leader of the "jihad experiment" was Max von Oppenheim, a German diplomat and aristocrat. He established an office nearby to lead a propaganda campaign with the "show camp", "self-consciously styled as a theatre for the wider world", at its centre. Oppenheim was assisted by Shaykh Sâlih al-Sharîf, a Tunisian who had served in the Ottoman Empire's intelligence agency. He served as a spiritual leader for the detainees. Furthermore, Oppenheim cooperated with the Berlin Committee (later: Indian Independence Committee) in order to publish a propagandist Urdu- and Hindi-language newspaper, which was distributed in the camp.

Anthropologists, musicologists like Robert Lachmann and linguists used the 'favourable conditions' within the camp to conduct research. The Royal Prussian Phonographic Commission, under the auspices of the linguist Wilhelm Doegen, set out to record voice and language samples in the shape of stories, poems and songs of over 250 languages. The remaining recordings are held at the phonographic archive of the Humboldt Universität of Berlin. In 2014/15, an exhibition called Phonographed Sounds - Photographed Moments                  presented sound and image documents from WWI German prison camps.

Up to 3,000 of the detainees from the camp were recruited into the German Army to fight in North Africa and the Middle East. However, low morale and troop revolt plagued the resulting divisions, and few believed in the jihadist cause. In 1917 the remaining prisoners were forced to agricultural labour in Romania.

The story of the camp was largely omitted from English-language texts, until nearly a century after the war. It was discussed extensively in German history works.

See also
 Mosque of the Bois de Vincennes

References

Further reading
Gerhard Höpp: Die Wünsdorfer Moschee. Eine Episode islamischen Lebens in Deutschland, 1915-1930. In: Die Welt des Islams, 1996, pages 204–218. 
Gerhard Höpp: Muslime in der Mark. Als Kriegsgefangene und Internierte in Wünsdorf und Zossen, 1914–1924. Verlag Das Arabische Buch, Berlin 1997,  
Martin Gussone: Die Moschee im Wünsdorfer „Halbmondlager“ zwischen Gihad-Propaganda und Orientalismus. In: Markus Ritter, Lorenz Korn (Hrsg.): Beiträge zur Islamischen Kunst und Archäologie, Reichert, Wiesbaden 2010, pages 204–232. 
Hanno Kabel: Gefangen unter der Moschee. In: Berliner Zeitung, 6 April 1996 
Gefangene Bilder. Wissenschaft und Propaganda im Ersten Weltkrieg. Benedikt Burkard (ed.). Petersberg, Imhof Verlag, 2014.  (Exhibition catalog Historisches Museum Frankfurt in Kooperation mit dem Frobenius-Institut an der Goethe-Universität Frankfurt und dem Institut français d'histoire en Allemagne / On occasion of an exhibition held at Historisches Museum Frankfurt, September 11, 2014 - February 15, 2015)
Heike Liebau: "„Unternehmungen und Aufwiegelungen“: Das Berliner Indische Unabhängigkeitskomitee in den Akten des Politischen Archivs des Auswärtigen Amts  (1914–1920)." In: MIDA Archival Reflexicon (2019), ISSN 2628-5029, 1–11.
Jürgen-K. Mahrenholz: "Südasiatische Sprach- und Musikaufnahmen im Lautarchiv der Humboldt-Universität zu Berlin." In: MIDA Archival Reflexicon (2020), ISSN 2628-5029, 1–19.

External links

Prisoner-of-war camps in Germany
World War I prisoner-of-war camps